Lisa S. Loo is the first Asian American to serve as President of the State Bar of Arizona.

She earned her law degree at the University of Virginia in 1985. In 2016, she began serving as the State Bar of Arizona’s first Asian American (female) president. Loo currently serves as the Senior Vice President and General Counsel for Arizona State University. Loo’s employment at the university began in 1993 after several years of practicing as a corporate lawyer.

See also 

 List of first women lawyers and judges in Arizona

References 

Arizona lawyers
20th-century American lawyers
University of Virginia School of Law alumni
Arizona State University faculty
21st-century American lawyers
Year of birth missing (living people)
Living people
20th-century American women lawyers
21st-century American women lawyers